Hawaii wine refers to wine made in the U.S. state of Hawaii. The island of Maui is where the bulk of the state's wine is produced though there is some production on the island of Hawaii. The state mainly produces fruit wine such as a pineapple sparkling wine. In July 2021, the Ulupalakua AVA was designated on Maui, the first American Viticultural Area in Hawaii and the only outside of the contiguous United States.

Grapes and wines
The Symphony grape is the principal grape wine made in the state and produces an off-dry, fruity white wine. Viticulture in Hawaii is made possible by the higher elevation of the area's volcanic mountains and ridges.

Availability within the United States
A law passed in 2001 and signed by Governor Ben Cayetano opened up the Hawaiian wine industry to more domestic trading within the mainland United States. The new law allows the state to enter into reciprocal trade agreements with other states, enabling residents of Hawaii to purchase wine directly from wineries in those states in exchange for those states allowing Hawaiian wineries to sell wine in those states without having to go through a wholesaler in the typical three-tier distribution system.

Winery and Vineyards
Three main winery-vineyards operate in Hawaii:

MauiWine, formerly Tedeschi Vineyards (on Maui)
Volcano Winery (on Hawaii Island)
Oeno Winemaking (on Oahu)

In November 2020, the TTB received a petition from Mark Beaman, winemaker at Maui Wines, proposing the establishment of the Ulupalakua AVA. The proposed Ulupalakua AVA is located within the 18,000-acre Ulupalakua Ranch on the island of Maui and is approximately 70 acres, with about 16 acres of vineyards. The AVA was approved in July 2021.

References

 
Hawaiian cuisine
Wine regions of the United States by state